Bedel Pass is a mountain pass in the Tian Shan Mountains range between Kyrgyzstan and China's Xinjiang. The pass linked China to Barskon, a settlement on the southern shore of lake Issyk-kul.

History
Historically, the Bedel Pass served as a Silk Road trade route between China and Central Asia. On the Chinese side, the Bedel Beacon Tower is located on the foothills along the path. It was built during the Han dynasty as part of the Han Great Wall. The beacon was reused and renovated during the Tang dynasty. During the Sui and Tang dynasties, the pass was the main trade route linking Tarim Basin and Western Turks in Central Asia. 

A number of scholars argue that Chinese explorer Xuanzang who inspired the Chinese classic Journey to the West used this pass in the 7th century on his journey to India. The name Xuanzang used for the passage was "", it was said to be northwest of "Kingdom of Baluka", modern day city of Aksu. However, others argue that was Muzart Pass.

The pass was surveyed in 1881 by both Chinese and Russian counterparts as part of Protocol of Chuguchak of 1864 demarcating the border in the region between the Russian Empire and the Qing Dynasty. During the Urkun incident of 1916, over 100,000 Kyrgyz reportedly died fleeing from Tsarist forces they attempted to reach China through the Bedel Pass. 

The pass is currently closed to traffic. Kumtor Gold Mine is located down the road on the Kyrgyz side. Along the path on the Chinese side is also the ruins of a KMT era sentry post which is a local cultural heritage site.

Historical maps
Historical maps of the region including Bedel Pass:

See also
 China–Kyrgyzstan border

References

Mountain passes of China
Mountain passes of Xinjiang
Mountain passes of Kyrgyzstan
China–Kyrgyzstan border crossings
Sites along the Silk Road